ZRL could refer to:

 Rayners Lane tube station, London, England; National Rail station code ZRL.
 Zambia Railways Limited
 ZRL.US Mobile Community
 Zweckverband SPNV Ruhr-Lippe,  Germany
 IBM Research – Zurich Research Laboratory (ZRL)